The 1979–80 Bulgarian Cup was the 40th season of the Bulgarian Cup (in this period the tournament was named Cup of the Soviet Army). Slavia Sofia won the competition, beating Beroe Stara Zagora 3–1 in the final at the Vasil Levski National Stadium.

First round

|-
!colspan=5 style="background-color:#D0F0C0;" |24 November 1979 / 1 December 1979

|}

Second round

|-
!colspan=5 style="background-color:#D0F0C0;" |8 December 1979 / 15 December 1979

|}

Third round

Quarter-finals

Semi-finals

Final

Details

References

1979-80
1979–80 domestic association football cups
Cup